Mount Howe is a rural locality in the Maranoa Region, Queensland, Australia. In the  Mount Howe had a population of 3 people.

Geography 
The Great Dividing Range forms the north-east, east and south-east boundaries of the locality.

The locality has the following mountains:

 Mount Eden 
 Mount Hetty 
 Mount Ramsay
 Mount Springvale 
 Snake Hill 
There are three areas within the Eden State Forest in the centre of the locality. Apart from these, the land use is grazing on native vegetation.

History 
In the  Mount Howe had a population of 3 people.

Economy 
There are a number of homesteads in the locality:

 Calline Creek
 Coonong
 East Sunrise
 Edenvale
 Glendonnell
 Glenolive
 Lying Downs
 Mount Hetty
 Myrtleville
 Saddler Springs
 Springvale
 Sunrise

Transport 
Some of the homesteads have airstrips:

 Myrtleville airstrip 
 Calline Creek airstrip

Education 
There are no schools in Mount Howe nor nearby. Distance education and boarding schools are options.

References 

Maranoa Region
Localities in Queensland